HMS Ossory was an  built for the Royal Navy during the First World War. She took part in the Battle of Jutland in 1916 and was sold for scrap in 1921.

Description
The Admiralty M class were improved and faster versions of the preceding . They displaced . They were powered by three Parsons direct-drive steam turbines, each driving one propeller shaft, using steam provided by four Yarrow boilers. The ships' complement was 76 officers and ratings.

The ships were armed with three single QF  Mark IV guns and two QF 1.5-pounder (37 mm) anti-aircraft guns. These latter guns were later replaced by a pair of QF 2-pounder (40 mm) "pom-pom" anti-aircraft guns. The ships were also fitted with two above water twin mounts for  torpedoes.

Construction and service
Ossory was ordered under the Third War Programme in November 1914 and built by John Brown & Company at Clydeside. The ship was laid down on 23 November 1914, launched on 9 October 1915 and completed in November 1915.

After commissioning, Ossosy joined the 11th Destroyer Flotilla of the Grand Fleet. Ossory was refitting in April 1916, but following the outbreak of the Easter Rising against British rule in Ireland on 24 April 1916, was employed in escorting transports carrying two infantry brigades from Liverpool to Ireland to reinforce British forces. She took part in the Battle of Jutland on 31 May – 1 June 1916, still part of the 11th Destroyer Flotilla. On 10 December 1916, Ossory, was one of three destroyers that were attached to the 4th Light Cruiser Squadron, and sent to patrol between Shetland and Norway in an attempt to intercept the German liner , which was about to leave safe harbour in Tromsø to return to Germany. Prinz Friedrich Wilhelm successfully escaped the British ships.

Philip Vian was appointed first lieutenant of the ship in 1917. Ossory was still part of the 11th Flotilla in July 1917, but by September that year had transferred to the 2nd Destroyer Flotilla, based at Buncrana in the North of Ireland. The ship was decommissioned following the First World War and was sold for scrap in November 1921.

Notes

Bibliography

External links 

 Battle of Jutland Crew Lists Project - HMS Ossory Crew List

Admiralty M-class destroyers
Ships built on the River Clyde
1915 ships
World War I destroyers of the United Kingdom